GH, Gh, gh, or .gh may refer to:

 gh (digraph), a digraph found in many languages
 Gästrike-Hälsinge nation, a student association at Uppsala University, Sweden
 General Hospital, an American daytime medical drama
 Ghana (ISO 3166-1 alpha-2 country code)
 .gh, the country code top-level domain for Ghana
 Gigahenry, an SI unit of electrical inductance
 Globus Airlines (IATA code)
 Growth hormone, a hormone which stimulates growth and cell reproduction in humans and other animals
 Grubhub, an American online and mobile prepared food ordering and delivery platform
 Guitar Hero, a video game series
 Guitar Hero (video game), the first in the series
 GH, a suspect in the assassination of Olof Palme
 Howard GH, military version of the DGA-15 biplane
 Iron Guard (Argentina), or Guardia de Hierro in Spanish
 DGH Degrees of general hardness (properly dGH or °GH, but sometimes written simply GH)